Olimpia Basket Pistoia, also known as Maltinti Pistoia after one of its historic sponsors, was an Italian professional basketball team from the town of Pistoia.

It played in Serie A, the Italian top-level professional league, in the 1990s. Their best result was 8th place in the 1992/93 season. It participated in the Korać Cup in the 1996/97 season. After the 1998/99 season, when they were relegated from Serie A, the team went bankrupt and is currently defunct. Pistoia is currently represented in LegADue by another team, Carmatic Pistoia.

The team was established in 1965 and, due to sponsorship deals, was also known as Kleenex Pistoia (1988–94), Madigan Pistoia (1994-96), Rolly Pistoia (1996–97) and Mabo Pistoia (1997-99).

Notable players 
  Leon Douglas 4 seasons: '87-'91
  Joe Bryant 2 seasons: '87-'89
  Andrea Daviddi 2 seasons: '87-'89
  Claudio Crippa 10 seasons: '88-'98
   Ron Rowan 3 seasons: '89-'92
  Luca Silvestrin 3 seasons: '89-'92
  Charles Jones 1 season: '90'-'91
  Dan Gay 3 seasons: '91-'93, '97-'98
  Massimo Minto 5 seasons: '92-'93, '94-'98
  Andrea Forti 3 seasons: '92-'95
  Joe Binion 2 seasons: '92-'94
  Francesco Vescovi 2 seasons: '93-'94, '97-'98
  Tod Murphy 1 season: '93-'94
  Adrian Caldwell 1 season: '93-'94
  Stephen Howard 1 season: '94-'95
  Marty Embry 1 season: '94-'95
  Irving Thomas 2 seasons: '95-'97
  Davide Ancilotto 1 season: '95-'96
  Ken Barlow 1 season: '95-'96
   Derrick Taylor 1 season: '96-'97
  Thomas Burrough 1 season: '96-'97
  Matteo Soragna 1 season: '96-'97
  Vincenzo Esposito 1 season: '97-'98
  Ian Lockhart 1 season: '97-'98
  Ed Stokes 1 season: '97-'98
  James Forrest 1 season: '98-'99
   Travis Mays 1 season: '98-'99
  John Turner 1 season: '98-'99

Defunct basketball teams in Italy
Basketball teams established in 1965